Astragalus sabulonum is a species of milkvetch known by the common name gravel milkvetch. It is native to the Southwestern United States and California, from desert to mountain habitats.

This is a hairy annual herb with stems up to about 26 centimeters long. Leaves are a few centimeters long and are made up of several hairy oval-shaped leaflets. The inflorescence is an open array of 2 to 7 off-white to pale lilac flowers each less than a centimeter in length.

The fruit is a curved, leathery, hairy legume pod up to 2 centimeters long.

External links
Jepson Manual Treatment
USDA Plants Profile
Photo gallery

sabulonum
Flora of the Southwestern United States
Flora of the Sonoran Deserts
Flora of the California desert regions
Flora without expected TNC conservation status